James Vann Johnston Jr. (born October 16, 1959) is an American prelate of the Roman Catholic Church. He has been serving as bishop of the Diocese of Kansas City-St. Joseph in Missouri since 2015.  He served as bishop of the Diocese of Springfield-Cape Girardeau in Missouri from 2008 to 2015.

Biography

Early life 
James Vann Johnston Jr. was born on  October 16, 1959, in Knoxville, Tennessee, to James Johnston (an accountant) and Pat (née Huber) Vann Johnston; his grandparents were Baptists. He has four younger siblings: two sisters, Beth and Amy, and one brother, Steve.  James Johnston Jr. was a member of the Boy Scouts of America, attaining the rank of eagle scout. After attending Knoxville Catholic High School in Knoxville, he studied at the University of Tennessee in Knoxville, obtaining a degree in electrical engineering in 1982.  Johnston then worked for an engineering consulting firm in Houston, Texas, until 1985.

Johnston has stated that the faith and generosity of his mother and the teachings of Pope John Paul II inspired him to enter the priesthood. He entered Saint Meinrad School of Theology in Saint Meinrad, Indiana, where he earned a Master of Divinity degree.

Priesthood 
Johnston was ordained for the Diocese of Knoxville by Bishop Anthony O'Connell on June 9, 1990; he was one of the first two priests ordained for the diocese after its creation.

From 1994 to 1996, Johnston attended The Catholic University of America School of Canon Law in Washington, D.C., receiving a Licentiate of Canon Law. He then served as an associate pastor at St. Mary's Parish in Oak Ridge, Tennessee and at St. Jude Parish in Chattanooga,Tennessee, where he also taught at Notre Dame High School. Johnston then returned to Knoxville as associate pastor of Holy Ghost Parish, where his family has been longtime parishioners. Johnston was named chancellor and moderator of the diocesan curia in 1996, and later pastor of Our Lady of Fatima Parish in Alcoa, Tennessee, in addition to his curial duties, on May 14, 2007.

In 2002, Johnston and two other priests, Reverends Kevin and John Dowling, saved a father and his two children while hiking in Glacier National Park in Montana. For their actions, the three priests were presented with the Citizen's Award for Bravery by the Secretary of the Interior, Gale Norton, on February 2, 2005. Upon receiving the award, Johnston remarked, "We were all very surprised, partly because it happened two and a half years ago. We didn't think too many people were even aware of it."

Considered somewhat conservative in his views, Johnston supports the celebration of Tridentine Mass, but has said he does not "hold a great personal attachment to it" due to his relatively young age. He also supports the use of Gregorian chant and polyphony. He has cited Dolly Parton, Chet Atkins, and Alan Jackson as some of his favorite musical artists.

Bishop of Springfield-Cape Girardeau 
On January 24, 2008, Johnston was appointed the sixth bishop of the Diocese of Springfield-Cape Girardeau by Pope Benedict XVI. He later stated at a press conference, "I am eager to learn about the Church in Southern Missouri, and to become part of God's family here." Johnston also announced that, as bishop, he would:"Seek out those who have fallen away from the practice of their Catholic faith, reach out to the unchurched, and seek to meet brothers and sisters of other faith communities and churches on areas of common belief and shared concerns." Johnston received his episcopal consecration on March 31 from Archbishop Raymond Burke, with Archbishop Joseph Kurtz and Bishop John Leibrecht serving as co-consecrators.  In May 2009, noting that President Barack Obama "has taken steps on multiple fronts to undermine the protection of innocent human life", Johnston said the decision of the University of Notre Dame to have Obama deliver the commencement speech at its graduation ceremony and receive an honorary degree was "saddening and bewildering." Johnston also said, "While we must pray for our president, respect his office, and acknowledge and support the good things he does to lead our nation, it is also our duty to make known our opposition to those actions and decisions that stand in direct opposition to the moral law and the foundational principals of America."Johnston criticized the treatment of Miss California Carrie Prejean, who placed second at Miss USA 2009 after being asked if she supported same-sex marriage and responding she did not. Johnston said the incident "...shows just how much American culture, in such a short time, has drifted away from the moorings that have given the nation strength and stability...[and] shows the fierce intolerance of many of those who advocate redefining marriage to include same-sex unions."

Bishop of Kansas City-St. Joseph
On September 15, 2015, Pope Francis named Johnston as bishop of the Diocese of Kansas City-St. Joseph. He was installed on November 4, 2015, in the Cathedral of the Immaculate Conception in Kansas City.

On June 27, 2016, in a special church service, Johnston apologized to victims of sexual abuse in the diocese for the abuse itself and the cover-up by the church.  His predecessor as bishop, Robert Finn, had pleaded guilty in 2012 to a charge of failing to report an individual abusing a child.

On September 14, 2020, just before the 2020 US presidential election, Johnston sent a controversial letter to parishioners in the diocese. In the letter, Johnston asked voters to examine which party supported so-called moral issues such as abortion rights.  When asked if Johnston was endorsing Republican Party candidates, he said that he was only asking voters to vote their conscience.

On March 23, 2021, Johnston announced the laicization in December 2020 of Michael Tierney, a former priest in the Diocese of Kansas City- St. Joseph. Tierney, who died in December, had faced multiple credible accusations of sexual abuse of children.

See also

 Catholic Church hierarchy
 Catholic Church in the United States
 Historical list of the Catholic bishops of the United States
 List of Catholic bishops of the United States
 Lists of patriarchs, archbishops, and bishops

References

External links

 Roman Catholic Diocese of Kansas City–Saint Joseph Official Site
 Catholic-Hierarchy

Episcopal succession

1959 births
Living people
People from Knoxville, Tennessee
Roman Catholic bishops of Springfield–Cape Girardeau
Roman Catholic bishops of Kansas City–Saint Joseph
21st-century Roman Catholic bishops in the United States
University of Tennessee alumni
Catholic University of America alumni
Catholics from Tennessee
Catholic University of America School of Canon Law